This list of Cambridge University Press journals includes all academic journals published by Cambridge Journals , including journals no longer published or no longer published by Cambridge, but for which they still maintain archives. Several journals in this list are published by Cambridge in cooperation with or on behalf of other entities such as learned and professional societies. In these cases Cambridge provides publishing and printing, distribution, online archives, and other services on behalf of the original publisher.

Cambridge Journals publishes journals under three main access policies: closed access, open access, and a hybrid model in which individual articles in an otherwise closed access journal is available under open access terms. Such articles are designated as open access by its author or publishing organisation at time of acceptance, and Cambridge Journals charges an article processing fee to cover their associated costs like peer-review, copy-editing, and typesetting. For articles published as open access in hybrid journals, Cambridge Journals applies what it terms its "double-dipping policy": for journals with more than a minimum share of open access articles (5%) and article processing fees (£5000), subscription rates are lowered for renewing subscribers the following year. In 2015, under this policy and using data from 2014, subscription renewal rates for 2016, were reduced for six journals by 2.6–7.7%. Articles published under open access terms may be licensed under one of several available Creative Commons licenses.

List of journals

See also
Cambridge University Press
Lists of academic journals
List of Oxford University Press journals

Notes and references

Notes

References

Sources

External links

Alphabetical list of journals

Journals, Cambridge University Press
Lists of academic journals by publisher